Joan Rodgers C.B.E. (born 1956, Cleator Moor, Cumbria, England) is an English operatic soprano. She was married to the conductor Paul Daniel, and married Alan Samson in 2013. She studied singing with Audrey Langford. She made her professional opera debut at the Aix-en-Provence Festival in 1982 as Pamina in Mozart's The Magic Flute; a role she later sang for her debut at the Metropolitan Opera in New York in 1995. In 1983 she made her debut at the English National Opera as the Wood Nymph in Rusalka, and performed for the first time at the Royal Opera House as the princess in L'enfant et les sortilèges. She made her debut at the Glyndebourne Festival Opera in 1989 as Susanna in Mozart's The Marriage of Figaro.

References

1956 births
Living people
English operatic sopranos
20th-century British women opera singers
21st-century British women opera singers
People from Cleator Moor
Commanders of the Order of the British Empire
Alumni of the University of Liverpool
Alumni of the Royal Northern College of Music